Ustalic acid is a naturally occurring chemical compound found in the poisonous mushroom Tricholoma ustale.

Occurrence

Toxicity
Ustalic acid is an inhibitor of the sodium-potassium pump (Na+/K+-ATPase), found in the plasma membrane of all animal cells. Physiologically, inhibition of the sodium-potassium pump generally causes diarrhea, as it prevents water reabsorption from the intestines. When force-fed to mice, ustalic acid causes them to sit still in a crouched position, hesitant to move, and induces tremors and abdominal contractions. High enough concentrations of the toxin (10 milligrams per mouse) cause death. Biosynthetically, ustalic acid is thought to originate from oxidative cleavage of the red pigment phlebiarubron.

Synthesis
A low-yield total synthesis of the dimethyl ester of ustalic acid was reported in 2006, starting with phlebiarubrone. The oxidation was achieved with lead tetraacetate. Hayakawa and colleagues reported a more efficient synthesis in 2008, using sesamol as a starting point. This procedure requires eight steps, and uses Suzuki–Miyaura coupling and oxidation of methylene acetal.

See also
 C19H14O6

References 

Mycotoxins found in Basidiomycota
Dicarboxylic acids
Dioxolanes